Fritz Uhl (2 April 1928 – 21 May 2001) was an Austrian operatic tenor, particularly associated with Wagner roles.

Born in Matzleinsdorf, near Vienna, he studied in Vienna with Elisabeth Radó, and while still a student toured the Netherlands with an operetta troupe. He made his operatic debut in Vienna, as Gounod's Faust in 1952, and then sang in Graz (1952–53), in Luzern (1953–54), in Oberhausen (1954–56), in Wuppertal (1956–58). In 1957, he began making guest appearances at the Munich State Opera, the Vienna State Opera, also appearing at the Salzburg Festival and the Bayreuth Festival.

He began his career by singing lyric roles and lighter Wagner roles such as Erik in Der fliegende Holländer, Loge in Das Rheingold, First Knight in Parsifal, and gradually moved into heldentenor roles such as Tristan, Siegmund, Stolzing, Florestan, and Herod.

He sang widely in Europe, appearing at the Paris Opéra, La Monnaie in Brussels, the Liceo in Barcelona, the Maggio Musicale Fiorentino, and the Royal Opera House in London. He was also invited at the San Francisco Opera and the Teatro Colón in Buenos Aires.

He took part in the creation of Ján Cikker's Das Spiel von Liebe und Tod in 1969, and in Heinrich Sutermeister's Le roi Béranger in 1985, both in Munich.

A forthright singer with a fine voice, he is best known for his recording of Tristan und Isolde, opposite Birgit Nilsson, under Sir Georg Solti.

Selected recordings

 Berlioz, Benvenuto Cellini : Edith Kermer (Teresa), Fritz Uhl (Cellini), Otto Wiener (Fieramosca), Leo Heppe, Grosses Wiener Rundfunkorchester, conducted by Kurt Tenner. (sung in german)  Wallhall Eternity series CD-9737514 (1952)

Sources
 Operissimo.com

1928 births
2001 deaths
Austrian operatic tenors
Heldentenors
20th-century Austrian male opera singers